Giancarlo Marinelli (4 December 1915 – 12 May 1987) was an Italian basketball player who competed in the 1936 Summer Olympics and the 1948 Summer Olympics. He was born in Bologna. Marinelli was part of the Italian basketball team, which finished seventh in the Olympic tournament. He played four matches.

References

External links
 
 part 7 the basketball tournament

1915 births
1987 deaths
Italian basketball coaches
Italian men's basketball players
Olympic basketball players of Italy
Basketball players at the 1936 Summer Olympics
Basketball players at the 1948 Summer Olympics
Sportspeople from Bologna
Virtus Bologna coaches